Yury Konstantinovich Kidyayev (born February 28, 1955, in Moscow) is a former Soviet/Russian handball player who competed in the 1976 Summer Olympics and in the 1980 Summer Olympics.

In 1976 he won the gold medal with the Soviet team. He played all six matches and scored fifteen goals.

Four years later he was part of the Soviet team which won the silver medal. He played five matches including the final and scored twelve goals.

External links
 profile

1955 births
Living people
Soviet male handball players
Russian male handball players
Handball players at the 1976 Summer Olympics
Handball players at the 1980 Summer Olympics
Olympic handball players of the Soviet Union
Olympic gold medalists for the Soviet Union
Olympic silver medalists for the Soviet Union
Olympic medalists in handball
Sportspeople from Moscow
Medalists at the 1980 Summer Olympics
Medalists at the 1976 Summer Olympics